Michael Gordon Skinner (born ), also known as Mickey, Mick, and Mike, is a former English rugby union player who played at flanker for Harlequins, Blackheath and . His nickname was "Mick the Munch" because of his propensity to inflict bone-shaking tackles on the opposition.  He was born in Newcastle-Upon-Tyne. He attended Walbottle Grammar School.

Career
Skinner is world-renowned for "The Tackle", his hit on Marc Cecillon in England's 1991 Rugby World Cup quarterfinal against  in Paris.  The match, which England won 19–10, was one of the most brutal in World Cup history.

Prior to making his England debut Skinner was required as a late addition to the England squad for the inaugural World Cup in 1987.  The R.F.U. however could not locate him which prompted an appeal from Desmond Lynam live on the BBC's Grandstand programme for Skinner to get in touch as his services were required.

During his career Skinner won a total of 21 caps for England. He made his England debut on 16 January 1988 in England's 10–9 defeat to France in Paris during the Five Nations. His final game for England was on 7 March 1992 against  at Twickenham as part of the Five Nations tournament.

In 1994, Skinner helped unveil the commemorative plaque to mark the founding of the Blackheath Football Club (Rugby) in 1858.

Retirement
Since leaving the game, Skinner has worked as a media pundit and became famous amongst fans for his interesting choices of waistcoat. He also featured in a video in which he introduces some of rugby's best tackles. He is an active supporter of Wooden Spoon charity.

Personal life
He has a daughter, Emily Skinner, who was born on 4 July 1995.
He also has three sons: Max, and Zak and Barnie who are twins.

References

1958 births
Living people
English rugby union players
England international rugby union players
Harlequin F.C. players
Rugby union players from Newcastle upon Tyne
Rugby union flankers
Kent County RFU players